Buster's Mal Heart is a 2016 surreal mystery film written, directed, and edited by Sarah Adina Smith.  It stars Rami Malek, DJ Qualls, and Kate Lyn Sheil.

The film had its world premiere at the Toronto International Film Festival on September 11, 2016. It was released on April 28, 2017, by Well Go USA Entertainment.

Plot 
An eccentric mountain man is on the run from the authorities, surviving the winter by breaking into empty vacation homes in a remote community. Regularly calling into radio talk shows — where he has acquired the nickname "Buster" — to rant about the impending inversion at the turn of the millennium, he is haunted by visions of being lost at sea, and memories of his former life as a family man.

Buster was once Jonah, a husband and father whose job as the night-shift concierge at a hotel took its toll on his psyche and, consequently, his marriage to Marty — until a chance encounter with conspiracy-obsessed drifter Brown changed the course of their lives forever. As the solitary present-day Buster drifts from house to house, eluding the local sheriff and law enforcement, the film portrays the events that fractured his life and left him alone on top of a snowy mountain, or in a small rowboat in the middle of an ocean, or both.

Cast

 Rami Malek as Jonás "Jonah" Cueyatl, a hotel concierge turned mountain man who acquires the nickname Buster
 DJ Qualls as Brown, a computer engineer who self-identifies as "the Last Free Man"
 Kate Lyn Sheil as Marty Cueyatl, Jonah's wife
 Sukha Belle Potter as Roxy Cueyatl, Jonah and Marty's daughter
 Lin Shaye as Pauline, Marty's mother
 Toby Huss as Deputy Winston
 Mark Kelly as Oscar Cueyatl, Jonah's father
 Teresa Yenque as Adelita Cueyatl, Jonah's mother
 Bruce Bundy as Ranger Meg
 Jared Larson as Dale
 Sandra Ellis as Mrs. Bowery
 Nicholas Pryor as Mr. Bowery
 Lily Gladstone as Kelly, the morning shift concierge at the hotel
 Sandra Seacat as a public access psychic
 Ross Partridge as the psychic caller

Production 
After producing her first feature film The Midnight Swim, Smith knew that she wanted to create a story about a man and a mountain. She wrote the script at the Screenwriters Colony in Nantucket, MA. It was a non-traditional script, that combined illustrations with scene descriptions so that it almost read like a short story.

While finding financing came surprisingly easily for such an unusual script, the biggest challenge was finding someone to cast as the lead. Originally planning to cast a Latino actor due to the bilingual nature of the main character Jonah, Smith widened the search to expedite the casting process, eventually deciding on Rami Malek who she had seen in Short Term 12 and The Pacific. A tarot-card reading confirmed her casting choice.

Buster's Mal Heart was filmed near Glacier National Park and in Kalispell, MT, as well as on the ocean in open water. Originally, Smith planned to film in her home-state of Colorado but, in the end, decided to shoot in Montana for the available state grant as well as the unique and dramatic landscape. The film was shot in 18 days.

Release 
Buster's Mal Heart premiered at the Toronto International Film Festival on September 11, 2016. Shortly after, Well Go USA Entertainment acquired U.S distribution rights to the film. The film went onto screen at the AFI Fest on November 11, 2016. and screened at the Tribeca Film Festival on April 26, 2017.

It was released on April 28, 2017.

Critical reception
Buster's Mal Heart received positive reviews from film critics. It holds a 70% approval rating on review aggregator website Rotten Tomatoes, based on 50 reviews, with an average score of 6.2/10. On Metacritic, the film holds a weighted average score of 63 out of 100 based on 15 critics, indicating "generally favorable reviews".

John DeFore of The Hollywood Reporter gave the film a positive review writing : "Fans of Mr. Robot won't be disappointed in the least by this vehicle for Emmy-winning series star Rami Malek, which both fits in with Mr. Robot's delusion-prone paranoia and lets the charismatic actor stretch out in his first feature lead." Jeanette Catsoulis of The New York Times also gave the film a positive review writing : "If the story is too tricky to realize its themes or welcome the impatient, it also contains enough empathy to humanize a character who's part man, part spiritual symbol." Geoff Berkshire of Variety also gave the film a positive review writing : "Whether he's playfully interacting with his wife and daughter, or delivering a madman's rant to thin air, Malek has the range to be utterly charming, utterly creepy, or both at once."

References

External links
 
 
 
 

2016 films
American drama films
American mystery films
American independent films
Films shot in Montana
Films about schizophrenia
Murder mystery films
2010s American films